Nicolas "Niki" Fürstauer (born July 18, 1980) is an Austrian alpine skier. He competed for Lebanon at the 2002 Winter Olympics in the slalom event, and also won the first ever and first gold Asian Winter Games medal for Lebanon at 2003 Asian Winter Games.

References

1980 births
Living people
Lebanese male alpine skiers
Olympic alpine skiers of Lebanon
Asian Games medalists in alpine skiing
Alpine skiers at the 2003 Asian Winter Games
Asian Games gold medalists for Lebanon
Asian Games silver medalists for Lebanon
Medalists at the 2003 Asian Winter Games
Alpine skiers at the 2002 Winter Olympics